"Someone's Coming" is a song by the British singer-songwriter Steve Harley, which was released in 1979 as the second and final single from his 1978 debut solo album Hobo with a Grin. It was written by Harley and Jo Partridge, and produced by Harley.

Background
The release of Harley's debut solo album, Hobo with a Grin, and the lead single "Roll the Dice", in July 1978 was met with commercial failure. After a period of living in Los Angeles, Harley returned to England in late 1978. Around this time, plans were made for "Someone's Coming" to be released as the album's second single. It was originally slated for release on 10 November 1978, however the date was then pushed back to 23 February 1979. For its release as a single, a remixed version of the song was created. Like its parent album and "Roll the Dice", "Someone's Coming" was a commercial failure, failing to make an appearance in the UK Top 75.

Like much of the Hobo with a Grin album, the song was recorded Abbey Road Studios in London. Any remixing or additional recording was done in Los Angeles, while the song and the album was mixed at Sunset Sound Recorders in Hollywood. The song features contributions from ex-Cockney Rebel members Duncan Mackay, George Ford and Stuart Elliott, while the backing vocals were provided by Gloria Jones and Yvonne Keeley.

Speaking to The Morning Call in September 1978, Harley told Len Righi that the song was one of the oldest on Hobo with a Grin and had originally been written for Steve Harley & Cockney Rebel. He also revealed that his close friend Marc Bolan had performed on the song, along with another track from the album, "Amerika the Brave", during Bolan's final studio session before his death in September 1977. He contributed backing vocals and acoustic guitar on the song, but was uncredited. Harley commented:

Release
"Someone's Coming" was released by EMI Records on 7" vinyl in the UK only. A promotional demo/DJ copy of the single was also issued by EMI. The single was released in a generic company sleeve. The B-Side, "Riding the Waves (For Virginia Woolf)", was written and produced by Harley. Taken from the Hobo with a Grin album, the song was recorded at Sunset Sound, Los Angeles. The song was later re-recorded for Harley's 1996 album Poetic Justice.

Following its release as a single, and on the Hobo with a Grin album, "Someone's Coming" has since appeared on the Steve Harley & Cockney Rebel 1988 Castle Communications compilation The Collection as part of the label's "The Collector Series".

Critical reception
On its release as a single, Paul Morley of New Musical Express described "Someone's Coming" as "a watery ballad, with mournful steel guitar and flabby strings." He questioned the song's chart potential, commenting, "Harley is definitely one of the main benefactors of the new pop and without losing any respect (he never really had any) he could continue with his old perfidious, insidious pop and have a few hits. But... elderly popsters just want to grow serious, bare themselves and reveal the stretchmarks." In a review of Hobo with a Grin, Rosalind Russell of Disc commented, "...the definition Harley had with Cockney Rebel has melted, he's gone fuzzy round the edges. He's also become surprisingly soppy. I can appreciate the idea behind "Someone's Coming" for instance, but the emotion drenched drama is too strong to stomach." Russell also noted the song "suffers from an oddly old fashioned arrangement", which she felt was "years out of date".

Chris Gibbons of the Buckinghamshire Examiner noted, "There is little of the bite or feeling that Cockney Rebel had - [and] "Someone's Coming", the one track where they all get together again, is even a limp track." Len Righi of The Morning Call spoke of the song, stating: "One of the best things about the song is Jo Partridge's guitar work."

Track listing
7-inch single
"Someone's Coming" – 4:36
"Riding the Waves (For Virginia Woolf)" – 4:34

Personnel
Someone's Coming
 Steve Harley – vocals
 Jo Partridge – electric guitar
 Marc Bolan – acoustic guitar, backing vocals
 Duncan Mackay – electric piano
 George Ford – bass
 Stuart Elliott – drums
 Lindsay Elliott – congas
 James Isaacson – tambourine
 Gloria Jones, Yvonne Keeley – backing vocals
 Jimmy Horowitz – strings arrangement

Riding the Waves (For Virginia Woolf)
 Steve Harley – vocals
 Jo Partridge – acoustic guitar, electric guitar
 Greg Porée – electric guitar
 Duncan Mackay – electric piano, synthesizer
 Bill Payne – piano
 Bob Glaub – bass
 Rick Shlosser – drums
 Bill Champlin, Bobby Kimball, Tom Kelley – backing vocals

Production
 Steve Harley – producer
 Michael J. Jackson – additional production, mixing
 James Isaacson – engineer, remixing, additional recording
 Tony Clark – engineer on "Someone's Coming"
 Haydn Bendall – assistant engineer – engineer on "Someone's Coming"

References

1979 singles
Steve Harley songs
EMI Records singles
Songs written by Steve Harley
1978 songs